Maniacal Renderings is a 2006 release by Jon Oliva's Pain. It was their first full-length studio recording released for new label AFM Records.

The album features material and riffs recorded by Jon Oliva's late brother, Criss. Jon said that he moves around a lot and his wife found a box of old cassette tapes inside a shoebox, with Criss's handwriting on it. Jon said that during their days in Savatage, the two would write, practice and record music, then swap so they could finish each other's songs. He stated that there is plenty of material from the box that could be used in future works.

Track listing

Personnel
Jon Oliva – lead vocals, keyboards
Matt LaPorte – guitars
Shane French – guitars
Kevin Rothney – bass
John Zahner – keyboards
Christopher Kinder – drums

Additional musicians 
Tony Oliva – 12-string guitar on "Still I Pray for You Now"
Anthony Oliva – bass on "Still I Pray for You Now"
Christopher J. Oliva – acoustic guitar on "Still I Pray for You Now", lead guitar on "Reality's Fool"
Adnan Al Hamdan – lead guitar on "Reality's Fool"

Further credits 
 Produced by Jon Oliva, Greg Marchak and Christopher Kinder
 Recorded by Greg Marchak at Audio Lab Studios in Tampa, Florida
 Mixed by Greg Marchak and Jim Morris at Morrisound Studios in Tampa, Florida; assisted by Jason Blackerby
 Engineered by Tom Morris, Christopher Kinder and Jason Blackerby
 Mastered by Greg Marchak and Kim Faulkenberry at Audio Lab Studios in Tampa, Florida
 Digital editing by Wes Price at Polysound
 Front and back cover artwork by Thomas Ewerhard
 Cover photography by Steffi Veenstra
 Booklet design by Kathy Tijou; assisted by Leia Tijou

2006 albums
Jon Oliva's Pain albums
AFM Records albums